Tekkali revenue division (or Tekkali division) is a revenue division in the Srikakulam district of the Indian state of Andhra Pradesh. It is one of the three revenue divisions in the district with nine mandals under its administration. The divisional headquarters are located at Tekkali.

Administration 
The 9 mandals administered under the revenue division are:

Demographics 
At the time of the 2011 census, the division had a population of 8,99,280. The rural population is 7,57,871 and the urban population is 1,41,409. Scheduled Castes and Scheduled Tribes make up 6.50% and 4.63% of the population respectively.

98.99% of the population are Hindus and 0.53% are Christians.

At the time of the 2011 census, 85.49% of the population spoke Telugu and 13.07% Odia as their first language.

See also 
List of revenue divisions in Andhra Pradesh
List of mandals in Andhra Pradesh

References 

Revenue divisions in Andhra Pradesh
Srikakulam district